The Captain General Gerardo Barrios Military School, abbreviated as the EMCGGB, was a military academy in El Salvador. It was established in 1868 and is named after Captain General Gerardo Barrios who served as President of El Salvador from 1859 to 1863. It was located in Antiguo Cuscatlán, Santa Tecla, La Libertad. It was demolished in June 2022 to make way for the construction of the Estadio Nacional de El Salvador.

History 

In 1867, a French military mission to El Salvador assisted President Francisco Dueñas in establishing a military academy for the country, which was opened on 21 February 1868 under the name Military College. The school was established in Antiguo Cuscatlán, Santa Tecla, La Libertad. Instructors at the military academy include military officers of Prussian, Chilean, American, and Salvadoran descent.

The name of the school was officially changed to the Captain General Gerardo Barrios Military School, after the President of El Salvador from 1859 to 1863, on 28 January 1927 by a presidential decree ordered by President Pío Romero Bosque. The name was again solidified by another presidential decree on 25 August 1965 by President General Julio Adalberto Rivera Carballo.A commemorative plaque was installed in 1982 that commemorated the class of 1936 which helped President General Maximiliano Hernández Martínez put down a indigenous and communist revolt in 1932. During the military dictatorship of 1931 to 1979, the school was referred to as the "School of the Presidents" since many presidents attended the military academy.

The school accepted more students than how many actually become military officers. Those who endured the exercises and practices of the school graduate and became officers. The first women began attending the school in 2000. On 30 November 2018, the Star of Captain General Gerardo Barrios was established and was awarded to military officers who graduate from the school. The school had a song called the "Himno de la EMCGGB" or "Hymn of the EMCGGB."

The Captain General Gerardo Barrios Military School was demolished in June 2022 to make way for the construction of the Estadio Nacional de El Salvador.

Notable alumni

Presidents of El Salvador 

Salvador Castaneda Castro (1888–1965) – President of El Salvador (1945–1948) and Director of the Gerardo Barrios Military School (1930–1931)
Arturo Armando Molina (1927–2021) – President of El Salvador (1972–1977)
Óscar Osorio (1910–1969) – President of El Salvador (1950–1956) and member of the Revolutionary Council of Government (1948–1950)
Julio Adalberto Rivera Carballo (1921–1973) – President of El Salvador (1962–1967)
Carlos Humberto Romero (1924–2017) – President of El Salvador (1977–1979) and Minister of National Defense (1972–1977)

Ministers of National Defense 

Rafael Humberto Larios López (born 1937), Minister of National Defense (1989–1990)
Juan Antonio Martínez Varela (1999–2004)
René Merino Monroy (born 1963) – Minister of National Defense (2019–present)
David Munguía Payés (birth unknown), Minister of National Defense (2009–2011, 2013–2019)
René Emilio Ponce (1947–2011) – Minister of National Defense (1990–1993)

Other military personnel 

Guillermo Alfredo Benavides (birth unknown) – Director of the Gerardo Barrios Military School (1989–1990) and ordered the 1989 murders of Jesuits
Roberto D'Aubuisson (1943–1992) – Death squad leader, President of the Legislative Assembly, presidential candidate
Jaime Abdul Gutiérrez (1936–2012) – Chairman of (1980), Vice President of (1980–1982), and member of (1979–1982) the Revolutionary Government Junta
Juan Francisco Emilio Mena Sandoval (unknown), Military officer who lead a mutiny during the Final Offensive of 1981
Domingo Monterrosa (1940–1984) – Ordered the El Mozote massacre

Academy directors 

Dr. Pío Romero Bosque, 1927
General Ramón González Suvillaga, 1927–1930
General Salvador Castaneda Castro, 1930–1931
Lieutenant Colonel José Avendaño, 1931–1932
Colonel José Antonio Lorenzana, 1932–1937
Colonel Alfonso Marroquín, 1937–1938
General Eberhardt Bohnstedt, 1938–1939 (Germany)
Colonel Zorobabel Galeno, 1939–1940 (Chile)
Lieutenant Colonel Roberto L. Christian, 1941–1943 (United States)
Colonel Rufus A. Byers, 1943–1946 (United States)
Colonel John F. Schmelzer, 1946–1948 (United States)
Colonel Henry C. Learnar, 1948–1949 (United States)
Colonel Ramón A. Nadal, 1949–1953 (United States)
Colonel Luis Lovo Castelar, 1953
Colonel Antonio Valdéz, 1953–1955
General Manuel de Jesús Córdova, 1956–1958
Colonel Luis Roberto Flores, 1958–1960
Colonel Francisco José Mijango, 1960–1961
Colonel Carlos Guzmán Aguilar, 1961
Colonel Rafael Cruz Garrido, 1961
Lieutenant Colonel Oscar Rank Altamirano, 1961
Colonel Mauricio Rivas Rodríguez, 1962–1963
Colonel Carlos Amaya, 1963–1964
Colonel Carlos Infante Guerra, 1964–1967
Lieutenant Colonel José Fernando Sigui Olivares, 1967–1969
Colonel Juan Antonio Martínez Varela, 1969–1971
Lieutenant Colonel Agustín Martinez Varela, 1971–1972
Colonel Julio González Palomo, 1972–1973
Colonel José Luis Ramón Rosales, 1973–1976
Colonel Anibal Velarde Figueroa, 1976–1977
Colonel José Antonio Corleto, 1978
Colonel Sócrates Roberto Echegoyén, 1979
Colonel Rafael Humberto Larios, 1980–1983
Colonel Luis Adalberto Landaverde, 1983
Colonel Ricardo Antonio Castellanos, 1985–1986
Colonel Jesús Gabriel Contreras, 1986–1987
Colonel Oscar Edgardo Casanova Vejar, 1987–1989
Colonel Guillermo Alfredo Benavides, 1989–1990
Colonel Ricardo A. Casanova Sandoval, 1990–1992
Colonel Julio César Grijalva, 1992
Colonel Nelson Ivan Saldaña Araujo, 1993
Colonel Alvaro Antonio Calderón Hurtado, 1993–1995
Colonel David Munguía Payés, 1996–1997
Colonel Luis Mario Aguilar Alfaro, 1998–1999
Colonel Simón Alberto Molina Montoya, 2000
Colonel Luis Mario Aguilar Alfaro, 2000–2001
Colonel Ricardo Benjamín Abrego Abrego, 2002
Colonel José Luis Alvarado Guevara, 2002
Colonel Willian Igdalí Moreno Segovia, 2003–2004
Colonel Julio Armando García Oliva, 2004–2005
Colonel Roberto Edmundo Rodriguez Abrego, 2006–2007
Colonel Roberto Artiga Chicas, 2007–2008
Colonel Walter Mauricio Arévalo Gavidia, 2009
Colonel Francisco E. Del Cid Díaz, 2010
Colonel Julio Héctor Hidalgo Martínez, 2010–2012
Colonel Félix Edgardo Núñez Escobar, 2012–2013
Colonel Walter Jacobo Lovato Villatoro, 2014
Colonel Carlos Alberto Ramírez Hernández, 2014
Colonel José Roberto Saleh Orellana, 2014–2017
Colonel Mario Ernesto Argueta Vásquez, 2017–2019
Colonel Roberto Ulises Santos Romero, 2019
Colonel Franklin Bladimir Gavarrete Galdámez, 2019–2022

Notable professors 

José Napoleón Duarte (1925–1990) – professor of mathematics, later President of El Salvador (1984–1989)

References

Citations

Bibliography

External links 
Archived website

1868 establishments in El Salvador
Military academies
Universities in El Salvador